A Pistol Shot may refer to:
 A Pistol Shot (1942 film)
 A Pistol Shot (1966 film)